Tx2 may refer to:

 Tx2, the global wildlife conservation goal to double tiger numbers by 2022
 HP Pavilion TX1000 Series Tablet PC, a laptop computer series from Hewlett Packard
 TXII, a London Taxi model